Košarkaški klub Vizura, commonly referred to as KK Vizura, is a men's basketball club based in Belgrade, Serbia. The club plays in the 3rd-tier First Regional League of Serbia. Their home arena is the Vizura Sports Center.

History 
The club was formed in 2003 under the name KK Vizura. In 2005, it merged with Ušće to form KK Vizura Ušće. In 2007, the name was switched back to KK Vizura.

In August 2009, before the start of the 2009–10 BLS season, the senior team merged with KK Mega Basket. In 2016, the new senior team joined the 4th-tier Second Regional League of Serbia. They got promoted to the 3rd-tier First Regional League of Serbia in the 2019–20 season.

Sponsorship naming
The club has had several denominations through the years due to its sponsorship:
 Vizura Shark (2014–2017)

Home arena 

Vizura plays its home games at the Vizura Sports Center. The hall is located in the New Belgrade Municipality on the Tošin Bunar Street, Belgrade and was built in 2002. It has a seating capacity of 1,500 seats.

Players

Coaches

  Dragiša Šarić (2005–2007)
  Oliver Popović (2007–2008)
  Vinko Bakić (2008)
  Oliver Popović (2008)
  Ivica Mavrenski (2008–2009)
  No senior team coaches, 2009–2016
  Aleksandar Bućan (2019–2021)

Season by season

Notable players

  Aleksandar Glintić
  Stevan Jelovac
  Sava Lešić

References

External links
 KK Vizura Ušće at srbijasport.net
 KK Vizura at srbijasport.net
 Profile at ksb.rs
 Profile at eurobasket.com
 Old Profile at eurobasket.com

Basketball teams in Serbia
Basketball teams established in 2003
2003 establishments in Serbia